The Tower of Grisgione or Tower of Grigione was a Genoese tower located in the commune of San-Martino-di-Lota on the east coast of Capicorsu on the Corsica. No trace of the tower survives.

The tower was constructed shortly after 1532. It was one of a series of defences constructed by the Republic of Genoa between 1530 and 1620 to stem the attacks by Barbary pirates. The tower is included (as Ghissone) in a list compiled by the Genoese authorities in 1617 that records that the tower was guarded by two men from the local area.

See also
List of Genoese towers in Corsica

References

Towers in Corsica